Italy and the colonization of the Americas was related to:

 Italian explorers and colonizers serving for other European nations;

 the role played by the Roman Pontiff in Christianizing the New World and resolving disputes between competing colonial powers;

 an aborted attempt to create a colony in the Americas, in what is now French Guiana, made by the Grand Duchy of Tuscany in the early 1600s;

 a tentative to create a colony in the Antilles by an Italian Grand Master of the Knights Hospitaller of Malta (then part of Sicily).

Grand Duchy of Tuscany expedition

The Grand Duchy of Tuscany (Ferdinando I) expedition to South America was the only tentative foray into colonization by Italians in the centuries after Columbus's discovery.

The Thornton expedition was a 1608 Tuscan expedition under Captain Robert Thornton, an Englishman, who was sent by Ferdinando I of Tuscany to explore northern Brazil and the Amazon River and prepare for the establishment of a settlement in northern coastal South America, which would serve as a base to export Brazilian wood to Renaissance Italy. 

The area that Thornton considered as a possible site of a Tuscan or Italian colony now lies in modern French Guiana, near Cayenne, which would be colonised by France in 1630.

In the first years of the 17th century Ferdinando I of Tuscany evaluated the possibility of a colony in Brasil and gave captain Thornton a caravelle and a tartane for an expedition in 1608. Thornton sailed for one year, reaching Guyana and Brasil, exploring the Amazon and Orinoco river but in February of that year the Grand Duke died and in Florence, no one thereafter considered establishing an overseas colony.

Indeed Thornton was ready to sail back to the area between the rivers Orinoco and Amazon in the summer of 1609 with nearly one hundred Italian settlers from Livorno and Lucca to create a settlement in the bay of actual Cayenne, but the project was scrapped. Thornton's galleon 'Santa Lucia' returned to Italy in 1609 with plenty of information (after exploring the area between Trinidad island and the delta of the Amazon river), some indigenous natives of the Americas and a few tropical parrots.

Malta's Knights Hospitaller

In the 17th century Malta was under the rule of the king of Sicily, who gave the direct control of the island to the Knights Hospitaller. Because of this rule Malta was considered an "Italian State" (like the Republic of Venice or the Grand Duchy of Tuscany)

Giovanni Paolo Lascaris, Italian nobleman and Grand Master of the Knights Hospitaller of Malta, was interested in colonial affairs and in 1651 bought the island of Saint-Christophe, along with the dependent islands of Saint Croix, Saint Barthélemy, and Saint Martin, from the failing Compagnie des Îles de l'Amérique. The Knights' ambassador to the French court, Jacques de Souvré, signed the agreement. 

The Order's proprietary rights were confirmed in a treaty with France two years later: while the king would remain sovereign, the Knights would have complete temporal and spiritual jurisdiction on their islands. The only limits to their rule were that they could only send French knights to govern the islands, and upon the accession of each new King of France they were to provide a gold crown worth 1,000 écus. In 1665, after Lascaris's death, the Knights sold their islands back to France, ending their brief colonial project.

See also
 European colonization of the Americas
 Italian diaspora in the Americas

References

Bibliography
 Ridolfi, R. Pensieri medicei di colonizzare il Brasile, in «Il Veltro» (luglio-agosto 1962). Roma, 1962

European colonization of the Americas
History of Italy by topic